Demos is a compilation album by Edith Frost, issued as a free download online on May 20, 2004 through Comfort Stand Recordings. It contains demos of songs that appeared on her first three albums.

Track listing

Personnel 
Jim Becker – guitar, dobro and violin on "I Get the Craziest Feeling" and "Look What Thoughts Will Do"
Edith Frost – vocals, acoustic guitar
Ryan Hembrey – bass guitar and piano on "I Get the Craziest Feeling" and "Look What Thoughts Will Do"
Davina Pallone – cover art
Jim White – drums on "I Get the Craziest Feeling" and "Look What Thoughts Will Do"

References 

2004 compilation albums
Demo albums
Edith Frost albums